Ace Combat: Assault Horizon Legacy, released as  in Japan, is a 2011 combat flight simulation video game developed by Access Games and published by Namco Bandai Games for the Nintendo 3DS. Despite the game's international title outside Japan, it has little relation to Ace Combat: Assault Horizon, and is instead a remake of Ace Combat 2. The original Japanese version features compatibility with the Circle Pad Pro accessory.

An enhanced version, was released on January 29, 2015 in Japan and in February 2015 in North America and Europe, featuring added support for Amiibo figures and updated control handling for the New Nintendo 3DS.

Gameplay 
Assault Horizon Legacy is a combat flight simulation game that is presented in a more arcade-like format in contrast to other flight-sim games. Its gameplay has been updated to fit contemporary Ace Combat gameplay, including newer features from the games released since Ace Combat 2, such as the high-g turn maneuver from Ace Combat 6: Fires of Liberation and the enemy ace squadron boss battles from Ace Combat Zero: The Belkan War.

Two new mechanics introduced in Assault Horizon Legacy are "Attack Maneuvers" and "Evasive Maneuvers", which simplify aerial maneuvers in a manner similar to Assault Horizon's Dogfight Mode. Attack Maneuvers require the player to stay as close to an enemy aircraft as possible to fill up the AM Gauge, and immediately position the player behind the targeted enemy aircraft. Evasive Maneuvers are performed to evade incoming missiles from any direction, and condense missile evasion to moving the Circle Pad left or right.

As in Ace Combat 2, the player can pay to have a wingman on certain missions, both returning from the original game: John "Slash" Herbert, who attacks enemies; and Kei "Edge" Nagase, who defends the player.

The game features additional aircraft not previously seen in Ace Combat 2, such as the Boeing F-15SE Silent Eagle and fifth-generation jet fighters such as the Sukhoi PAK FA.

Plot
The plot of Assault Horizon Legacy is similar to the original plot of Ace Combat 2, featuring updated lore relating to its settings and plot events, including the series' fictional universe of Strangereal, where Earth has entirely different nations, geography, and history. The game's story details the 1998 Usean coup d'état, fought between the Usean Allied Forces (UAF) and the Usean Rebel Forces (URF) in the continent of Usea.

In 1997, four years after the Belkan War and two years before the Ulysses impact event, the nations of the continent of Usea, concerned about Osean and Yuktobanian expansionism, agree to form the UAF, an alliance between Usean countries. However, some countries in southern Usea consider siding with the Osean Federation after it offers to sign a military treaty with them, sparking objections and controversy. On May 30, 1997, the day of the treaty signing, conservative extremists in several Usean militaries, including some UAF defectors, engineer a continent-wide coup d'état, forming the URF. The UAF fights back, but by 1998, the UAF, suffering from defections and pushed to their last line of defense in the Twinkle Islands in southwest Usea, initiates "Operation Fighter's Honor", a counterattack led by Scarface Squadron, the elite mercenary fighter squadron that put down the Skully Islands insurrection four years prior.

Reception

Ace Combat: Assault Horizon Legacy received generally mixed reviews, with Metacritic tallying up to a 71 out of 100 (from 37 reviews) and GameRankings 72.28% out of 25 reviews.

Nintendo Power awarded the game a score of 7.5 out of 10, stating "Ace Combat: Assault Horizon Legacy may not be a beefy adventure, but because virtually everything that's great about Namco Bandai's long-running series is present here, it's well worth playing". IGN awarded it an 8.0, praising it for "beautiful environments" and impressive 3D effects, but criticized it for a short campaign and lack of multiplayer.

References

2011 video games
Assault_Horizon_Legacy
Combat flight simulators
Nintendo 3DS games
Nintendo 3DS eShop games
Nintendo 3DS-only games
Single-player video games
Video game remakes
Video game prequels
Video games developed in Japan
Video games scored by Go Shiina
Video games scored by Wataru Hokoyama
Video games set in a fictional country
Video games that use Amiibo figurines
ja:エースコンバット2#エースコンバット3D クロスランブル